Easy may refer to:

Arts and entertainment

Film and television
Easy (film), a 2003 American romantic comedy film 
Easy!, or Scialla!, a 2011 Italian comedy film
Easy (TV series), a 2016–2019 American comedy-drama anthology series

Music

Albums
Easy (Easybeats album), 1965
Easy (Grant Green album), 1978
Easy (Grinspoon album), 1999
Easy (Kelly Willis album) or the title song, 2002
Easy (Marvin Gaye and Tammi Terrell album), 1969
Easy (Nancy Wilson album), 1968
Easy (Ralph McTell album), 1974
Easy, by Cowboy Mouth, 2000

Songs
"Easy" (Commodores song), 1977; covered by Faith No More, 1992
"Easy" (Camila Cabello song), 2019
"Easy" (Cro song), 2012
"Easy" (DaniLeigh song), 2019
"Easy" (Dragonette song), 2010
"Easy" (Ice MC song), 1989
"Easy" (Mat Zo and Porter Robinson song), 2013
"Easy" (Pale Waves song), 2021
"Easy" (Paula DeAnda song), 2007
"Easy" (Rascal Flatts song), featuring Natasha Bedingfield, 2011
“Easy” (Sheryl Crow song), 2013
"Easy" (Sugababes song), 2006
"Easy" (Troye Sivan song), 2020
"Easy", by Barenaked Ladies from Barenaked Ladies Are Me, 2006
"Easy", by Bonnie McKee from Bombastic, 2015
"Easy", by Busted from Night Driver, 2016
“Easy”, by Curved Air from Air Cut, 1973
"Easy", by the Dandy Warhols from Odditorium or Warlords of Mars, 2005
"Easy", by Deer Tick from Born on Flag Day, 2009
"Easy", by Demi Lovato from Dancing with the Devil... the Art of Starting Over, 2021
"Easy", by Ella Mai from Ella Mai, 2018
"Easy", by Groove Armada from Lovebox, 2002
"Easy", by Joanna Newsom from Have One on Me, 2010
"Easy", by Matthew Sweet from Earth, 1989
"Easy", by Nicki Minaj, Gucci Mane and Rocko from Beam Me Up Scotty, 2009
"Easy", by Nik Kershaw from The Riddle, 1984
"Easy", by No Doubt from Push and Shove, 2012
"Easy", by Rich the Kid from Boss Man, 2020
"Easy", by Son Lux from Lanterns, 2013
"Easy", by Stray Kids from Go Live, 2020
"Easy", by Terrorvision from Regular Urban Survivors, 1996
"Easy", by Tokio Hotel from Dream Machine, 2017
"Easy", by Tycho from Weather, 2019
"Easy", by Violent Soho from Everything Is A-OK, 2020
"Easy Easy", by the Scotland national football team, 1974
"Easy Easy", by King Krule from 6 Feet Beneath the Moon, 2013
"Easy", by Nick Carter and Jimmie Allen, 2022

Radio and television stations
Easy FM, in Beijing, China
Easy FM (Kenya)
Easy FM (New Zealand)
Easy TV, in Ireland
Easy TV (Philippines)

Businesses and organisations
easyGroup, the holding company controlling the "easy" family of brands
EasyJet
Easy (store), a South American chain of homecenters
Easy Card, a series of linked contactless smartcard systems in Florida, U.S.

Other uses
EASY programme, an application procedure for seeking asylum in Germany
Enhanced avionics system (EASy), an avionics suite used on Dassault Falcon business jets

See also

Ease (disambiguation)
Easy Come Easy Go (disambiguation)
Eazy (disambiguation)
EZ (disambiguation)
Hurricane Easy (disambiguation)
Izi (disambiguation)
Simple (disambiguation)
Take It Easy (disambiguation)
The Big Easy (disambiguation)